Banana roll or banana cake is a common Chinese pastry found in Hong Kong, and may occasionally be found in some overseas Chinatowns. The pastry is soft and made with glutinous rice. Ingredients may vary depending on location. Each roll or cake is a banana oil flavored circular tube or flat object, slightly bigger than an adult sized index finger, thus resembling banana. Sometimes it may have a cinnamon swirl filling. At other times it may have a filling that consists of a very ripe (but not rotten) banana diced finely. Occasionally the more traditional red bean paste may be used.

See also
 Black sesame roll
 Swiss roll
 Cinnamon roll

References

Chinese desserts
Hong Kong cuisine